Temescal Canyon may refer to:

Temescal Canyon, Los Angeles County, California
 Temescal Canyon, Riverside County, California

See also 
Temescal Creek (disambiguation)